The First Traveling Saleslady is a 1956 American film, starring Ginger Rogers and Carol Channing. Commercially unsuccessful, it was among the films that helped to close RKO Pictures.

Future western stars Clint Eastwood and James Arness have supporting roles in the film.

Plot
Corset company owner and independent-thinking suffragette Rose Gillray has her wagon struck by a 'horseless carriage' in 1897 New York. This early automobile is driven by Charlie Masters, who tells her it is the transportation of the future.

At work, Rose is helping singer Molly Wade into a boldly designed new corset when she gets the idea that using it for Molly's costume on stage would help to promote sales, but instead the show is shut down by the police.

With her business failing, Rose owes money to Jim Carter, whose steel business manufactures the metal used for a corset's stays. Jim takes a shine to Rose and offers her a chance to sell his barbed wire, which is not selling well out west, where his salesmen get run out of town ... or worse.

She ends up in Kansas City, accompanied by Molly and followed by Charlie. A cattlemen's association convention seems a good place to try to sell the barbed wire. However, cattle rancher Joel Kingdon gives her the runaround, attracted to her personally but warning her against peddling wire. She tries his home state of Texas next, but once again, Joel interferes, putting the women out of business temporarily. Rose eventually disproves the claim that barbed wire injures cattle, but she demonstrates that the cattle are smart enough to avoid impaling themselves, and the sales start rolling in.

Joel and Jim both fall in love with Rose and propose marriage, but she rejects both. Charlie, though, comes along offering a ride to California, where he is got another new notion that he wants to explore: machines that fly.

Cast
 Ginger Rogers as Rose Gillray
 Carol Channing as Molly Wade
 Barry Nelson as Charles Masters
 David Brian as James Carter
 James Arness as Joel Kingdom
 Clint Eastwood as Lt. Rice

Production
The film was based on an original story by Stephen Longstreet. It was Ginger Rogers' first movie at RKO for a number of years. "It's a very cute story", said Rogers. "It's for the whole family and I was delighted to make a family story."  The role was originally intended for Mae West and according to an article in the November 8, 1955 issue of The Hollywood Reporter, Betty Grable was set to play Miss Rose Gillray.

The movie marked the film debut for Carol Channing. It was Barry Nelson's first film in five years. Clint Eastwood was under personal contract to producer-director Arthur Lubin, who used him in a number of films. James Arness was under contract to John Wayne and had just established himself in the CBS-TV western Gunsmoke.

The movie was part of a $22 million slate of 11 films announced by RKO for the first half of 1956. Others included Back from Eternity, Beyond a Reasonable Doubt, Stage Struck, Bundle of Joy, A Farewell to Arms, The Syndicate, Cash McCall and Is This Our Son. Ultimately, RKO would only make a few of these films.

Filming took place in January and February 1956.

RKO's head of production, William Dozier, signed Channing to a five-year contract at two films a year. It was to begin with a musical remake of Stage Door but RKO went out of business some time after the contract was signed.

Reception
The film was not a financial success. According to a history of the studio. "the picture quickly faded into oblivion. RKO Teleradio needed a box-office rocket to blast off its first program of movies; instead, it tossed out a fizzling cherry bomb."

See also
 List of American films of 1956

References

External links
 
 
 
 
 Review of film at Variety

1956 films
1956 Western (genre) films
American Western (genre) films
Films directed by Arthur Lubin
Films set in Kansas City, Missouri
Films set in Texas
RKO Pictures films
1950s American films